Kyoko is a Japanese feminine given name. 

Kyoko may also refer to: 
Kyoko (novel), a 1995 novel by Ryu Murakami
Kyoko (film), a 2000 film by Ryu Murakami
35441 Kyoko, a main-belt asteroid discovered in 1998
Kyoko, a musical project of Beatnik Filmstars singer Andrew Jarrett